is a 1975 Japanese pink film directed by Kan Mukai. It has a reputation as being the prolific director's "most notorious feature" and best known film.

Synopsis
Kumi Taguchi is a model who leaves her boxer boyfriend after he sustains an injury. She meets and quickly marries Hideo, the heir to a corporate empire. Hideo's father, Takehiko, lusts after Kumi. Takehiko sends his son away, ostensibly on a business trip, but actually so that he can be murdered by Takehiko's henchmen. Takehiko seduces Kumi, but is frustrated when she refuses to perform oral sex on him. Angered, Takehiko forces Kumi to undergo surgery in which her clitoris is transferred to her throat, thereby requiring that she engage in oral sex in order to have an orgasm. Hideo, the supposedly murdered son, returns having paid off his assassins. Hideo shoots and kills his father, but Kumi grabs the gun and kills Hideo so that she can inherit the family's fortune.

Cast
 Kumi Taguchi as Kumi Sakuma
 Hideo Murota Takehiko Sakuma
 Tatsuya Nanjō Hideo Sakuma
 Tetsuya Chiba as Ken'ichi Hirota
 Akiko Mori as Shinobu Miura
 Yūko Akane as Mayumi
 Fumio Watanabe as Kawata

Critical appraisal
Deep Throat in Tokyo was part of a fad during the mid-1970s of taking foreign sex films as inspiration for domestic releases. Nikkatsu's Tokyo Emmanuelle (1975) and Lady Chatterley In Tokyo (1977) were part of this trend, the former film starring Deep Throat in Tokyo'''s Kumi Taguchi.

In his Behind the Pink Curtain: The Complete History of Japanese Sex Cinema (1998), Jasper Sharp compares Deep Throat in Tokyo to its US inspiration, Deep Throat (1972). According to Sharp, Mukai's film has much better production values, taking an "airbrushed fantasy" approach more similar to the French Emmanuelle'' (1974) than the "crude and direct" US film. Nevertheless, Mukai's film presents a reactionary attitude towards sex in direct opposition to the liberated approach attempted in the US film. While the US film portrayed sex as something to be enjoyed by both men and women, in Mukai's film, it is for the man to enjoy at the woman's expense. In contrast to the humorous approach taken by the US film, Mukai's plays its subject seriously, which, Sharp notes, enables it to be enjoyed in a camp manner. As an example of this aspect of the film, Sharp singles out a scene soon after Kumi's operation, in which she first experiences post-surgery orgasm by shoving a banana down her throat. Red wine flows down Kumi's throat signifying the loss of her "virginity", as the orchestral soundtrack swells for dramatic emphasis.

Bibliography

English

Japanese

Notes

1975 films
Erotic fantasy films
Films directed by Kan Mukai
Toei Company films
1970s Japanese-language films
Toei Pinky Violence
1970s Japanese films